Johannes Frans de Moor (5 May 1912, Amsterdam – 22 January 1983, Amsterdam) was a Dutch boxer who competed in the 1936 Summer Olympics.

In 1936 he was eliminated in the first round of the bantamweight class after losing his fight to Alfredo Petrone of Uruguay.

External links
profile

1912 births
1983 deaths
Bantamweight boxers
Olympic boxers of the Netherlands
Boxers at the 1936 Summer Olympics
Boxers from Amsterdam
Dutch male boxers